In Greek mythology, Peneleos ( Pēneléōs) or, less commonly, Peneleus ( Pēnéleos), son of Hippalcimus (Hippalmus) and Asterope, was an Achaean soldier in the Trojan War.

Mythology 
Before the war began he was said to have sailed with the Argonauts; he also was one of the suitors of Helen, which obliged him to join in the campaign against Troy. He came from Boeotia and commanded 12 ships. It is also said that Peneleos was chosen to command the Boeotian troops because Tisamenus, son and successor of Thersander, was still too young.

Peneleos killed two Trojans, Ilioneus and Lycon, was wounded by Polydamas and was killed by Eurypylus (son of Telephus). He left a son Opheltes, whose own son (Peneleos' grandson) Damasichthon succeeded Autesion, son of Tisamenus, as the ruler over Thebes.

His descendant, Philotas of Thebes, was said to be the founder of Priene in Ionia.

See also 
 Thersanon
 Scamandrius

Notes

References 

 Apollodorus, The Library with an English Translation by Sir James George Frazer, F.B.A., F.R.S. in 2 Volumes, Cambridge, MA, Harvard University Press; London, William Heinemann Ltd. 1921. ISBN 0-674-99135-4. Online version at the Perseus Digital Library. Greek text available from the same website.
Dictys Cretensis, from The Trojan War. The Chronicles of Dictys of Crete and Dares the Phrygian translated by Richard McIlwaine Frazer, Jr. (1931-). Indiana University Press. 1966. Online version at the Topos Text Project.
 Diodorus Siculus, The Library of History translated by Charles Henry Oldfather. Twelve volumes. Loeb Classical Library. Cambridge, Massachusetts: Harvard University Press; London: William Heinemann, Ltd. 1989. Vol. 3. Books 4.59–8. Online version at Bill Thayer's Web Site
 Diodorus Siculus, Bibliotheca Historica. Vol 1-2. Immanel Bekker. Ludwig Dindorf. Friedrich Vogel. in aedibus B. G. Teubneri. Leipzig. 1888–1890. Greek text available at the Perseus Digital Library.
 Gaius Julius Hyginus, Fabulae from The Myths of Hyginus translated and edited by Mary Grant. University of Kansas Publications in Humanistic Studies. Online version at the Topos Text Project.
 Homer, The Iliad with an English Translation by A.T. Murray, Ph.D. in two volumes. Cambridge, MA., Harvard University Press; London, William Heinemann, Ltd. 1924. . Online version at the Perseus Digital Library.
 Homer, Homeri Opera in five volumes. Oxford, Oxford University Press. 1920. . Greek text available at the Perseus Digital Library.
 Pausanias, Description of Greece with an English Translation by W.H.S. Jones, Litt.D., and H.A. Ormerod, M.A., in 4 Volumes. Cambridge, MA, Harvard University Press; London, William Heinemann Ltd. 1918. . Online version at the Perseus Digital Library
 Pausanias, Graeciae Descriptio. 3 vols. Leipzig, Teubner. 1903.  Greek text available at the Perseus Digital Library.
Tzetzes, John, Allegories of the Iliad translated by Goldwyn, Adam J. and Kokkini, Dimitra. Dumbarton Oaks Medieval Library, Harvard University Press, 2015. 

Argonauts
Achaean Leaders

Boeotian characters in Greek mythology